KQIC (102.5 FM) is an American radio station located in Willmar, Minnesota, United States.

KQIC has a strong signal that can be picked up across most of Central Minnesota. It began as an AOR station in the 1960s, but now features a hot adult contemporary format.

Affiliation
KQIC (Q102) in Minnesota is one of four stations in the Lakeland Broadcasting Group, which includes KOLV ("100.1 BIG Country"), KLFN ("106.5 The Train"), and KWLM ("News/Talk 1340").

Beginning in March 2020, the weekday lineup has included Eric Grieger on overnights, Tim Burns and Kyle Callaghan on mornings, MaryElin Macht on middays, Jay Roberts on afternoon drive, and Molly Penny on evenings. During the workday, dayparts are supplemented with news updates from J.P. Cola and hourly sports updates from Todd Bergeth, as well as agricultural news from the Linder Farm Network.

KQIC airs syndicated programs Backtrax USA, American Top 40 and the Beacon every Sunday.

References

External links 
 

Radio stations in Minnesota
Hot adult contemporary radio stations in the United States